Edward Francis Lafitte (April 7, 1886April 12, 1971) was a pitcher in Major League Baseball who played with the Detroit Tigers (1909–12), Brooklyn Tip-Tops (1914–15), and Buffalo Blues (1915). Born in New Orleans, Louisiana, at his family's home located at 319 Bourbon Street, he batted and threw right-handed.

Baseball career
Lafitte pitched for the Georgia Institute of Technology baseball team in 1906 and 1907. He also was a starter in the first intercollegiate basketball game ever played by Georgia Tech.
He made his debut with the Detroit Tigers in 1909. After an 11-8 season with the 1911 Tigers, Lafitte told manager Hughie Jennings that he wanted to leave early the following season to resume dental school. Jennings told him if he left early to keep on going. Lafitte did. He became a dentist, but also pitched in the Federal League.

Lafitte returned to baseball in 1914 as a member of the Brooklyn Tip-Tops of the fledgling Federal League. That season he became the first pitcher to throw a no-hitter without throwing a shutout in a 6–2 victory over the Kansas City Packers on September 19. In 1914, he split his final season between the Tip-Tops and the Buffalo Blues.

Personal life
Lafitte served in the U.S. Army during both World Wars. Baseball helped him earn a degree in dentistry, and he practiced dentistry for 42 years in Philadelphia, Pennsylvania, retiring in 1961. The Jenkintown, Pennsylvania, resident died at age 85 at his home and is buried at Ivy Hill Cemetery in Philadelphia.

Despite assertions by some authors to the contrary, Ed Lafitte was not a descendant of the famed New Orleans pirate, Jean Lafitte.  Ed Lafitte was the son of James Arnauld Lafitte (born March 31, 1846, in Charleston, South Carolina; died March 16, 1907, in Atlanta, Georgia), who was the son of John Baptiste Lafitte (born June 24, 1822, in Augusta, Georgia; died May 21, 1887, in New Orleans, Louisiana), who was the son of James Bertrand Lafitte (born October 16, 1770, in Tartas, France; died November 13, 1838, in Charleston, South Carolina).  Since the pirate Jean Lafitte's life span was c.1776-c.1823, it is not possible that Ed Lafitte was his descendant.  It is unknown if they were more distantly related.

See also
 List of Major League Baseball no-hitters
 1911 Detroit Tigers season

Notes

References 
Dewey, Donald & Acocella, Nicholas (1996). Ball Clubs. HarperCollins Publishers. .

External links

1886 births
1971 deaths
American people of French descent
Baseball players from New Orleans
Major League Baseball pitchers
Detroit Tigers players
Brooklyn Tip-Tops players
Buffalo Blues players
American dentists
Georgia Tech Yellow Jackets baseball players
Jersey City Skeeters players
Providence Grays (minor league) players
Rochester Bronchos players
Atlanta Crackers players
United States Army personnel of World War I
United States Army personnel of World War II
Marist School (Georgia) alumni
Burials at Ivy Hill Cemetery (Philadelphia)
20th-century dentists
United States Army officers